Bulbophyllum muscicola is a species of orchid in the genus Bulbophyllum. It is native to the eastern Himalayan region, and the Asian tropics.

References

The Bulbophyllum-Checklist
The Internet Orchid Species Photo Encyclopedia

muscicola
Plants described in 1872